Marie-Noémi Cadiot (12 December 1828, Paris – 10 April 1888, Saint-Jean-Cap-Ferrat), also known as Noémi (or Noémie) Constant and her literary pseudonyms Claude Vignon and H. Morel, was a French sculptor, journalist and writer of the 19th century.

Biography

In 1846, while still a minor, Cadiot eloped with Alphonse Louis Constant, better known as occultist Eliphas Levi; her father, a government official, forced Constant to marry her. They had stillborn twins and a daughter, Mary, who died in 1854 at the age of seven years. Cadiot left Constant in the early 1850s for Marquis Alexandre de Montferrier, brother-in-law of Messianist philosopher Józef Maria Hoene-Wroński, and had the marriage annulled in 1865.

In the late 1850s she had a liaison with architect Hector Lefuel, from which a son was born in 1859 whom she called Louis Vignon.

She remarried with politician Maurice Rouvier on 3 September 1872.

She died on 10 April 1888 in Saint-Jean-Cap-Ferrat and was buried at the Père Lachaise Cemetery in Paris.

Sculpture
{{multiple image| align=right| total_width=300
| image1=Escalier Lefuel (Louvre), les génies des arts et leurs attributs.jpg
| image2=Escalier Lefuel (Louvre), les génies des sciences et leurs attributs.jpg
| footer = Arts and Sciences, Cadiot's reliefs in the Louvre Palace's escalier Lefuel}}

Cadiot studied sculpture in the workshop of James Pradier.

Literary work

She attended the Mrs Niboyet's Women's Club, and wrote in the Le Tintamarre and Le Moniteur du Soir soaps under the literary pseudonym of Claude Vignon (a character from a novel by Honoré de Balzac), which was formalised in 1866. She also published under the literary pseudonym of H. Morel.

Cadiot published Contes à faire peur in 1857, Un drame en province - La statue d'Apollon in 1863, Révoltée!, Un naufrage parisien in 1869, Château-Gaillard in 1874, and Victoire Normand'' in 1862.

References

External links

1832 births
1888 deaths
Burials at Père Lachaise Cemetery
19th-century French sculptors
19th-century French women artists